Arthur Hauffe (20 December 1892 – 22 July 1944) was a German general during World War II and commanded the XIII Army Corps.  He was recipient of the Knight's Cross of the Iron Cross of Nazi Germany.

Role in Romania during World War II

While Hauffe was chief of the German Army Mission in Romania, he signed on 30 August 1941 with General Nicolae Tătăranu of the Romanian War Headquarters the "Agreement for the Security, Administration, and Economic Exploitation of the Territory between the Dniester and the Bug and the Bug-Dnieper." Paragraph 7 of the agreement dealt with the Jews in the camps and ghettos of Bessarabia and Bukovina and the Jewish inhabitants of Transnistria: "The evacuation of the Jews across the Bug is not possible now. They must therefore be concentrated in labor camps and used for various work until, once the operations are over, their evacuation to the East will be possible." The agreement made clear that the ultimate goal was to “cleanse” the relevant territories of their Jewish inhabitants.

Role in German defeats in the northern Ukraine

Hauffe was General of Infantry during the Lvov–Sandomierz Offensive. The Lvov-Sandomierz Offensive was a major Red Army operation to force the German troops from Ukraine and Eastern Poland which was launched in mid-July 1944.  During this military engagement, General Hauffe failed to prepare for the withdrawal of his troops when they were threatened by encirclement.  He also failed to show up at headquarters during the final phase of the offensive from 20 July 1944 to 22 July 1944 thus forcing Lieutenant General Wolfgang Lange to assume command of the XIII Army Corps. His inaction led to the encirclement of his troops in the Brody pocket, where they were destroyed. He was captured by Soviet troops on 22 July 1944 and died later the same day when he stepped on a land mine.

Awards

 Knight's Cross of the Iron Cross on 25 July 1943 as Generalleutnant and commander of 46. Infanterie-Division

References

Citations

Bibliography

 
 Mitcham Samuel W.  (2007). "The German Defeat in the East, 1944-45." United States: Stackpole Books.  .

External links
 Final Report of the International Commission on the Holocaust in Romania

1892 births
1944 deaths
Military personnel from Chemnitz
German Army generals of World War II
Generals of Infantry (Wehrmacht)
German Army personnel of World War I
Reichswehr personnel
Recipients of the clasp to the Iron Cross, 1st class
People from the Kingdom of Saxony
Recipients of the Gold German Cross
Recipients of the Knight's Cross of the Iron Cross
German Army personnel killed in World War II
German prisoners of war in World War II held by the Soviet Union
German people who died in Soviet detention
Landmine victims